Collateral Damage is a 1993 Canadian dramatic short film written and directed by Leonard Farlinger. The film stars Gary Farmer as Glen, a counter clerk in a diner who is surprised when a news anchor (David Nichols) stops reporting on the Gulf War and begins talking directly to him through the television set. The cast also includes Michael Mahonen and Gabrielle Rose as customers of the diner.

The film had its theatrical premiere in 1993 at the Montreal World Film Festival, but was distributed primarily as an episode of the Global Television Network's New Producers Series anthology of short films by emerging Canadian directors.

The film was a Genie Award nominee for Best Theatrical Short Film at the 15th Genie Awards in 1994.

References

External links
 

1993 films
1993 short films
1993 drama films
Films set in restaurants
Films directed by Leonard Farlinger
Gulf War films
1990s English-language films
Canadian drama short films
1990s Canadian films